Obluchensky (masculine), Obluchenskaya (feminine), or Obluchenskoye (neuter) may refer to:
Obluchensky District, a district of the Jewish Autonomous Oblast, Russia
Obluchenskoye Urban Settlement, a municipal formation which the town of Obluchye and five rural localities in Obluchensky District of the Jewish Autonomous Oblast, Russia are incorporated as